The Eminence Formation or Eminence Dolomite is a geologic formation in Missouri. It preserves fossils dating back to the Cambrian period.

Paleofauna

Monoplacophora
 Biloboconus
 B. frizzelli
 Potosiplina
 P. delorensis

See also

 List of fossiliferous stratigraphic units in Missouri
 Paleontology in Missouri

References

 

Cambrian Missouri
Dolomite formations
Landforms of Shannon County, Missouri
Geologic formations of Missouri
Cambrian southern paleotropical deposits